Saint John Fisher (c. 1469–1535) was an English religious leader.

John or Jack Fisher may also refer to:

Entertainment
 John Fisher the elder, and John Fisher the younger (sculptors) (1760s–1839), father and son sculptors in York, England
 John Abraham Fisher (1744–1806), English violinist
 John Fisher (opera director) (born 1950), Scottish opera director
 John Fisher (EastEnders)

Politics
 John Fisher (writer) (died 1590), bailiff of Warwick and writer, MP for Warwick 1571, 1572, 1584
 John Fisher (North American politician) (1806–1882), politician in Canada and the United States
 John Fisher (New Zealand politician) (1837–1927), New Zealand politician
 John Henry Fisher (1855–1933), Ontario merchant and politician
 John Stuchell Fisher (1867–1940), American politician in Pennsylvania

Religion
 John Fisher (bishop of Salisbury) (1748–1825), English religious leader
 John Fisher (priest) (1788–1832), Archdeacon of Berkshire

Science
 John William Fisher (1788–1876), British surgeon
 John Dix Fisher (1797–1850), American physician, founder of Perkins School for the Blind
 John W. Fisher (born 1931), American professor of civil engineering
 John Bradford Fisher (born 1953), cosmetic surgeon
 John Fisher (biomedical engineer), British biomedical engineer

Sports
 John Fisher (cricketer) (1897–1954), English cricketer
 John Fisher (footballer, born 1937) (1937–1998), Australian rules footballer
 John Fisher (footballer, born 1941), Australian rules footballer
 John Fisher (ice hockey) (born 1947), Scottish player in the World Hockey Association

Schools

England
 Ss John Fisher and Thomas More Roman Catholic High School, Colne, England
 St John Fisher Catholic College, in Newcastle-under-Lyme, Staffordshire, England
 St John Fisher Catholic High School, Harrogate, England
 St John Fisher Catholic High School, Wigan, England
 St John Fisher Catholic School, in Chatham, Kent, England
 St John Fisher Catholic Voluntary Academy, Dewsbury, England
 The John Fisher School, boys secondary school in Purley, England

Elsewhere
 St. John Fisher College (University of Tasmania), in Australia
 St. John Fisher University, in New York,

Other
 John Fisher (Delaware judge) (1771–1823), District Court judge
 John Charlton Fisher (1794–1849), Canadian author and journalist
 John Harvey Fisher (1837–1895), Union Army officer and Medal of Honor recipient
 John Fisher, 1st Baron Fisher (1841–1920), British admiral
 John Fisher (Australian journalist) (1910–1960)
 John Hurt Fisher (1919–2015), American professor of English
 John R. Fisher (born 1946), District of Columbia Court of Appeals judge
 John J. Fisher (born 1961), American owner of the Oakland Athletics

See also
 John Fischer (disambiguation)
 Jonathan Fisher (disambiguation)
 Jackie Fisher (disambiguation)
 Johann Fischer (disambiguation)